Parveen Akbar is a Pakistani actress. She is known for her roles in dramas Zamani Manzil Kay Maskharay, Ab Dekh Khuda Kya Karta Hai, Yeh Zindagi Hai and Deewangi.

Career
She started her acting career in 1970 and appeared in dramas on PTV. She appeared in dramas and noted for her roles in Zamani Manzil Kay Maskharay, Ab Dekh Khuda Kya Karta Hai, Yeh Zindagi Hai and Deewangi.

Personal life
Parveen is married and has three children. Parveen daughter Rabya Kulsoom and son Muhammad Faizan Sheikh are both actors. Actress Maham Amir is her daughter-in-law and actor Rehan Nizami is her son-in-law.

Filmography

Television

Web series

Telefilm

Film

References

External links
 
 

1959 births
Living people
20th-century Pakistani actresses
Pakistani television actresses
21st-century Pakistani actresses
Pakistani film actresses